Ramones Mania is the first greatest hits album by the American punk rock band the Ramones. It was released on May 31, 1988 through Sire Records and consists of 30 Ramones songs, including some single versions ("Sheena Is a Punk Rocker," "Needles & Pins" and "Howling at the Moon"), a single B-side ("Indian Giver") and one previously unreleased take (the film version of "Rock 'n' Roll High School").

The album contains a booklet with a short history of the Ramones, including the release dates of all their albums. Their best-selling album, the compilation was their only album certified Gold in the United States, until their debut album went Gold in 2014.

Ramones Mania was re-released on multi-colored vinyl for Record Store Day in 2010. A sequel was released in Japan in 2000.  A tribute album titled Ramones Maniacs was released in 2001;  it featured turn-of-the-century punk bands covering every song from Mania in the same order.

Track listing

Personnel

Ramones
 Joey Ramone – vocals
 Johnny Ramone – guitar
 Dee Dee Ramone – bass, background vocals; lead vocals ("Wart Hog")
 Tommy Ramone – drums (Ramones, Leave Home, Rocket to Russia) 
 Marky Ramone – drums (Road to Ruin, "Rock 'n' Roll High School", End of the Century, Pleasant Dreams, Subterranean Jungle, "Indian Giver")
 Richie Ramone – drums, background vocals (Too Tough to Die, Animal Boy, Halfway to Sanity)

Technical
 Craig Leon – producer (Ramones)
 Tony Bongiovi – co-producer (Leave Home, Rocket to Russia)
 Tommy Ramone – co-producer (Leave Home, Rocket to Russia, Road to Ruin, Too Tough to Die)
 Ed Stasium – producer ("Rock 'n' Roll High School"), co-producer (Road to Ruin, Too Tough to Die), digital remastering 
 Phil Spector – producer (End of the Century)
 Graham Gouldman – producer (Pleasant Dreams)
 Ritchie Cordell – co-producer (Subterranean Jungle, "Indian Giver")
 Glen Kolotkin – co-producer (Subterranean Jungle, "Indian Giver")
 Jean Beauvoir – producer (Animal Boy)
 Daniel Rey – co-producer (Halfway to Sanity)
 Ramones – co-producer (Halfway to Sanity)
 Arturo Vega – collage design, lighting director
 George DuBose – design coordinator, front cover photo
 Mark Weinberg – art director
 Ebet Roberts – back cover photo
 Ed Valentine – inner sleeve illustration
 Greg Calbi – digital remastering
 Kevin Laffey – compilation producer

Charts

Certifications

References 

Ramones albums
Albums produced by Tony Bongiovi
Albums produced by Phil Spector
Albums produced by Graham Gouldman
1988 greatest hits albums
Albums produced by Ed Stasium
Albums produced by Daniel Rey
Albums produced by Jean Beauvoir
Sire Records compilation albums